Wadi Usam is a sub-district located in al-Saddah District, Ibb Governorate, Yemen.Wadi Usam had a population of 5630 according to the 2004 census.

References 

Sub-districts in As Saddah District